Theta vayssierei is a species of sea snail, a marine gastropod mollusk in the family Raphitomidae. The taxonomy of this species was clarified by Dautzenberg in 1925, who assigned it to the genus Theta. It has been knowns by the synonyms Gymnobela bathyiberica and Pleurotomella bathyiberica.

Description
The length of the shell attains 53 mm.

Distribution
This species is found in the Mediterranean Sea.

Biology and Ecology 
Little is known about the biology and ecology of this species. Further research may provide more information about its distribution, behavior, and potential interactions with other species.

References 

 Dautzenberg P. (1925). Mollusques nouveaux provenant des croisières du Prince Albert Ier de Monaco. Bulletin de l'Institut Océanographique de Monaco 457: 1-12
 Fechter, R. (1976) Pleurotomella (Theta) bathyiberica sp. nov. und Neufunde von Pleurotomella (Theta) lyronuclea Clarke, 1959 aus dem Inerischen Tiefseebecken. "Meteor" Forschungsergebnisse Reihe (D-Biologie), 22, 70–76.
 Gofas, S.; Le Renard, J.; Bouchet, P. (2001). Mollusca. in: Costello, M.J. et al. (eds), European Register of Marine Species: a check-list of the marine species in Europe and a bibliography of guides to their identification. Patrimoines Naturels. 50: 180–213.

External links
  Powell A.W.B.(1966) The molluscan families Speightiidae and Turridae: an evaluation of the valid taxa, both recent and fossil, with lists of characteristic species; Bulletin of the Auckland Institute and Museum ; no. 5
 

vayssierei
Gastropods described in 1925